Hanspeter Ziörjen (born 7 January 1958) is a Swiss sports shooter. He competed in the men's 10 metre air rifle event at the 1988 Summer Olympics.

References

1958 births
Living people
Swiss male sport shooters
Olympic shooters of Switzerland
Shooters at the 1988 Summer Olympics
Place of birth missing (living people)